Svealandsbanan is the Swedish name of the Svealand Railway, which runs between Södertälje and Valskog (near Arboga) via Mariefred Läggesta, Strängnäs and Eskilstuna.

The railway was opened between Södertälje and Eskilstuna in 1997. It replaced an older railway from 1895 with a different more curvy route. The part between Eskilstuna and Valskog was built in 1877.

The railway Södertälje-Eskilstuna is built as a high-speed railway with gentle curves that is mainly single tracked. Today trains are allowed to run at 200 km/h, without needing tilting trains. The railway is single track with several kilometers long passing loops, kind of partial double track, allowing trains passing each other at speed, instead of one of them stopping to let the other pass. The railway has three double-track sections: between Nykvarn and Läggesta; between Strängnäs and Härad, completed in June 2018; and between Eskilstuna and Folkesta, an intermodal terminal in Eskilstuna Municipality.

The passenger trains usually run between Stockholm and Arboga, but goes as far as Örebro in rush hour. From 2019, the new ER1 trains are used on all passenger services on the line.

The number of passengers have greatly exceeded expectations and is often used as an example of what a modern railway can accomplish.

References

Railway lines in Sweden
Railway lines opened in 1997
1997 establishments in Sweden